Boji is a former woreda (district) in the Oromia Region of Ethiopia.

Boji may also refer to:
 Boji Tower, building in Lansing, Michigan, United States completed in 1931
 Boji (dog), a street dog in Istanbul

People with the surname Boji include:
Aimé Boji, Congolese politician

See also

Bozi (disambiguation)